Robert Dingley may refer to:

Robert Dingley (died 1395), MP for Wiltshire
Robert Dingley (died 1456), MP for Hampshire
Robert Dingley (FRS) (baptised 1710–1781), merchant, banker and philanthropist
Robert Dingley (puritan) (1619–1660)